Neolipoptena ferrisi, or the Pacific deer ked, is a species of fly from the family Hippoboscidae. They are blood-feeding parasites of the mule deer - Odocoileus hemionus, the white-tailed deer - Odocoileus virginianus & The Pronghorn - Antilocapra americana. They are found from British Columbia, Canada, to Baja California, Mexico.

They are often misidentified as ticks.

The female fly will produce a single larvae at a time, retaining the larva internally until it is ready to pupate. The larva feeds on the secretions of a milk gland in the uterus of the female. After three larval instars, a white pre-pupa which immediately forms a hard dark puparium. The pupa is usually deposited where the deer slept overnight. When the pupa has completed its pupation. a winged adult emerges and flies in search of a suitable host, upon which fly sheds its wings and is permanently associated with the same host. This is typical of most members of the family Hippoboscidae.

References 

Parasitic flies
Parasitic arthropods of mammals
Hippoboscidae
Insects described in 1935
Diptera of North America
Taxa named by Joseph Charles Bequaert